Ascalenia pachnodes is a moth in the family Cosmopterigidae. It has been recorded from Nubia and India (Bengal).

The wingspan is 6–9.2 mm.

The larvae feed on the twigs of Tamarix species, including Tamarix gallica, Tamarix indica and Tamarix dioica.

References

Moths described in 1917
Ascalenia
Moths of Africa
Moths of Asia